Ivo Ringe (born July 5, 1951) is a German  artist, who is classified as a concrete art painter. He is also a docent and a curator of international group exhibitions.

Life and work
In 1972 Ringe began studying sculpture at the Kunstakademie Düsseldorf under the instruction of professor Joseph Beuys.  Like Imi Knoebel and Blinky Palermo, Ringe belongs to the Minimalism (visual arts)#Minimal art movement among Beuys' students.

In 1974 he shifted the focus of this study and became a scholar of professor Rolf Sackenheim devoting himself to the study of graphic arts. In 1977 Ivo Ringe was awarded "Master scholar" ("Meisterschüler") by  Rolf Sackenheim. Already during his studies, Ringe explored tessellation and Islamic geometric patterns, manifesting works of silkscreen print, etching and ceramic tile.

A 1992 fire in his studio destroyed many of the artist's works.

Since 2008, Ringe has been a lecturer in the fields of drawing and illustration technique at the Academy of Design "Ecosign", founded by Karin-Simone Fuhs. Since 2011, he is docent and since 2014 artistic director of the studio for fine arts ("Atelier für Bildende Kunst") at the Rheinische Friedrich-Wilhelms-Universität Bonn. Ringe lives and works in Cologne, Germany. In 2015, Ringe had an extensive exhibition of his works at the Kunsthaus Rehau in Rehau, Germany, that inspired Eugen Gomringer to write a sonnet about his work.  Ringe lives and works in Cologne, Germany. He is a member of the Deutscher Künstlerbund. Ringe is married to the US-American sculptor Heather Sheehan.

Work 

First, Ivo Ringe sets the background color of the painting, that often appears to be monochromatic, but in reality consists of a multitude of differing color nuances that overlap one another: "It is not unusual for a supposedly black surface to emerge from the laying of many shades of dark blue and violet. In the case of white, there are often up to six different layers of white superimposed on each other." (In German: "So entsteht nicht selten eine vermeintlich schwarze Fläche aus dem Nebeneinander vieler Dunkelblau- und Violett-Töne. In einem Weiß sind häufig bis zu sechs verschiedene weiße Flächen übereinandergesetzt.")  These colors are the result of Ringe's mixtures of powder pigments. He then sets orientation points on the canvas, which he connects with brush strokes to create a net-like structure. The position of these points is based on classical proportions of beauty, as they were formulated in antiquity.

Ringe uses the Golden ratio, but also works with proportions from other culture's ideals of beauty, such as those from ancient Sanskrit texts. These net-like formations sometimes reach beyond the border of the painting, appearing to be without beginning or end. The structures are reminiscent of those occurring in the formation of crystals and other structures in nature. His works manifest – as in nature – from preliminary fundamentals and phenomenon which occur in the act of painting: "His approach [...] consciously draws an equivalence between the formal development of a painting and the growth of a leaf or a crystal; in each, complexity is achieved through the interaction of preset and random elements."

Curatorship 
In 2014 Ivo Ringe curated together with Viola Weigel the group exhibition "Strukturen/Structures: British and German Painting in Dialogue", which was shown successively at the Kunsthalle Wilhelmshaven (May 10, 2014 to August 24, 2014) and at the Newlyn Art Gallery & The Exchange (October 11, 2014 to January 3, 2015).  Eight British and German artists, whose abstract works are characterized by structures, showed their works. The artists in the exhibition were selected by Ringe, who also had considered the concept of the exhibition. Also in 2014 (November 18 to December 13, 2014) Ivo Ringe curated together with Joe Barnes and Po Kim the group exhibition Painting Black for the Sylvia Wald and Po Kim-Art Gallery in New York with more than 30 artists from different countries.

A group exhibition entitled Restructured took place at the Newlyn Art Gallery & The Exchange from July 18 to October 8, 2016, with artists from the first exhibition in 2014 and newcomers exhibiting their work. The artists were selected by Ivo Ringe.From 18 July to 6 August, many of the artists worked on site in a residency programme. Visitors were able to visit them in the studio and follow live how the works were created. Parallel to this, lectures and seminars by the artists took place. Blair Todd, the museum's curator, mentioned in a video interview that it was largely thanks to Ivo Ringe's "energy and passion" that this Artist-in-residence took place. James Green, the director, explains in the same video that the museum is not only interested in exhibiting current positions in abstract art, but above all in creating a "creative experimental space", in which artists can inspire each other. From February 10 to 24, 2018, another Artist in Residency on the theme of Structures took place in Penzance, again the artists were selected by Ivo Ringe.

As a result of the exhibition Painting Black in New York in 2014, Ivo Ringe was invited by the Art collector Carl-Jürgen Schroth in Soest to organize an exhibition on this subject in the "Sammlung Schroth" at the Museum Wilhelm Morgner. 42 international artists from various countries showed their black works.

In 2020, Ivo Ringe curated together with the curator Juliane Rogge the group exhibition Multilayer Vision 20/20, for the "Sammlung Schroth" at the Museum Wilhelm Morgner, in Soest, Germany. Recent works of concrete art from fifty international artists were chosen to show the advancements in this field one-hundred years after the time of Theo van Doesburg. Today, "Concrete art not only conquers the third dimension, but also adapts itself to the complexity of the present." (In German: "Die Konkrete Kunst erobert sich nicht nur die dritte Dimension, sondern passt sich damit auch einer komplexen Gegenwart an.")

Collections 
 Museum Katharinenhof, Kranenburg, Germany. Title: ELECTRIC CHAIR, 2008 / Acrylic on canvas, 78 x 64 cm
 Artothek Köln, Cologne, Germany, two paintings
 Collection of Art, Cooperative Bank Offenburg, Germany
 Kunstmuseum Villa Zanders Bergisch Gladbach, Germany

Solo exhibitions 
 1993: Ivo Ringe - In den Bovenzaal, Galerie Nouvelles Images, Den Haag, Netherlands
 1994: Ivo Ringe – Der Heilige Narr, Stadtmuseum Siegburg, Siegburg, Germany
 2006: Ivo Ringe – New Paintings, McBride Fine Art, Antwerpen, Belgium
 2007: Artothek Köln, Köln, Germany
 2009: Denn da ist keine Stelle, die Dich nicht sieht, Neue Galerie Landshut, Landshut, Germany
 2009: Der Moment des Tuns, Schaltwerk Kunst, Hamburg, Germany
 2010: Cosi parlo Zarathustra, Antico Castello sul Mare, Rapallo, Italy
 2011: Ivo Ringe: New Moment, Schaltwerk Kunst, Hamburg, Germany 

 2015: Wisse das Bild, Institut für Konstruktive Kunst und Konkrete Poesie (IKKP), Kunsthaus Rehau, Germany
 2016: Die Proportion der Dinge, Galerie Nana Preussners, Hamburg, Germany
 2016: Morphic Fields,  Hionas Gallery, New York 
 2018: Ivo Ringe: Or burst out from its confines and radiate, Tremenheere Sculpture Gardens, Penzance, England
 2019: Ivo Ringe: Simple Present, Galerie Floss & Schultz, Cologne, Germany

Group exhibitions 
 2002: Concrete Art, Conny Dietzschold Gallery, Sydney, Australia
 2003: Die Achtsamkeit des Augenblicks - 5 Maler, Neuer Kunstverein Aschaffenburg, Germany, (amongst others with Jon Groom and Jerry Zeniuk)
 2005: At the Moment, Studio 18 Gallery, New York, (u. a. with Jon Groom and Jerry Zeniuk)
 2008: NOW! Museum Katharinenhof, Kranenburg, Germany 
 2009: Six Years McBride Fine Art, Antwerpen, Belgium, (u. a. with Mona Breede and Thomas Grünfeld)
 2011: Ornamental, Städtische Galerie Lippstadt, Germany 
 2013: Reticulate, McKenzie Fine Art, New York, (u. a. with Vija Celmins, Yayoi Kusama, Mark Sheinkman, Mark Lombardi)
 2014: Strukturen/Structures - Britische und Deutsche Malerei im Dialog, Kunsthalle Wilhelmshaven, Germany  (with Tim Allen, Andrew Bick, Mark Francis, Ian McKeever, Günther Förg, Michael Jäger and Miro Zahra)
 2014: Structures/Strukturen - British and German Painting in Dialogue, Newlyn Art Gallery, England, (with Tim Allen, Andrew Bick, Mark Francis, Ian McKeever, Günther Förg, Michael Jäger and Miro Zahra)
 2014: Painting Black, Sylvia Wald and Po Kim Art Gallery, New York (with et al. Alain Biltereyst, Matthew Deleget, Vincent Como, Robert C. Morgan, Heiner Thiel and Don Voisine)
 2016: Restructured, Newlyn Art Gallery, England, (with Tim Allen, Stefan Annerel, Andrew Bick, Rupert Eder, Mark Francis, Luke Frost, Günther Förg, Michael Jäger, Michelle Jaffé, Alf Löhr, Frank Norden, Terry Pope, Heather Sheehan, Shawn Stipling)
2016: The Pattern reveals Itself, Claudia Weil Galerie, Friedberg, Germany
 2017: Painting Black, Sammlung Schroth at the Museum Wilhelm Morgner, Soest, Germany
2017: The underlying Shape, Galerie Floss und Schultz, Cologne, Germany
 2018: Structures Residency, Newlyn Art Gallery, Penzance, England
 2018: Grounds for Optimism, Tremenheere Sculpture Gardens, Penzance, England
2018: Köln Plus – Farbmalereipositionen, Verein für aktuelle Kunst e.V. Oberhausen, Oberhausen, Germany
 2019: Dots, Points, Circles, Claudia Weil Galerie, Friedberg, Germany
 2020: Schönheit!? (Beauty!?, Galerie Gisela Clement, Bonn, Germany

 Bibliography 

 Honnef, Klaus, Ivo Ringe, Katalog zur Ausstellung Ivo Ringe'' der Galerie Apicella, 1991

References

External links 
 Ivo Ringe at kunstaspekte.art
 Ivo Ringe at artfacts.net
  
 

Concrete art
20th-century German painters
20th-century German male artists
German male painters
21st-century German painters
21st-century German male artists
Modern painters
German abstract artists
German contemporary artists
Artists from Bonn
1951 births
Living people